Argyrochosma nivea is an Andean fern species in the genus Argyrochosma.

Description

Morphology
The rhizome is short, thick, and more or less upright. The margins are entire (without teeth), or the walls of the marginal cells may project from the margin. The scales often become strongly crisped (wavy) when dried.

The stipe (the stalk of the leaf, below the blade) is slender, rounded, dull (rather than shiny), lacks hairs and scales, and varies from a bright to a dark chestnut-brown. It is typically shorter than to about as long as the leaf blade. The leaf blades are lanceolate or deltate-lanceolate to ovate in shape, and tripinnate (cut into pinnae, pinnules, and pinnulets). The rachis (leaf axis) is similar in appearance to the stipe. It bears up to 12 pairs of pinnae, nearly opposite to one another, on stalks. They are ovate to lanceolate in shape. The pinnules are long and also borne on stalks. The pinnulets are broadly oblong to nearly orbicular (circular), obtuse (blunt) at the tip and truncate (abruptly cut off) to nearly cordate (heart-shaped) at the base, with entire margins. The dark color of the segment stalks stops abruptly at a joint at the base of the leaf segment. The segment at the tip of the pinnule is often lobed. The leaf tissue is leathery in texture, free of hairs and scales above and densely covered in white farina (powder) below.

In fertile leaf segments, the sporangia are close to the margin, borne along the further one-half to one-quarter of the secondary veins branching from the midrib of the segment. Each sporangium contains 32 spores. The tissue of the leaf margins retains the same texture as the rest of the leaf, and is not modified into a false indusium.

Phytochemistry
Isonotholaenic acid, a dihydrostilbenoid, and other bibenzyls can be found in A. nivea. This compound shows an anti-chagasic activity.

Varieties
Historically, A. flava and A. tenera have often been treated as varieties of this species. Yellow farina is the most distinctive trait of A. flava; it also differs in several more subtle characteristics, having a darker stipe and rhizome scales that are not crisped (wavy). A lack of farina distinguishes A. tenera from A. nivea sensu stricto. It is also less dissected (usually only bipinnate, except at the base of the leaf blade), and has rhizome scales not strongly crisped.

Another variety, Notholaena nivea var. obscura, has sometimes been distinguished from typical material, although it has no combination in Argyrochosma. It has somewhat less dissected leaves than A. nivea s.s. (bipinnate to almost tripinnate at the base), more oblong ultimate segments (sometimes almost triangular and lobed), terminal segments usually entire rather than lobed, a bright chestnut-brown stipe, and rhizome scales that are not crisped.

Taxonomy
The species was first described as Pteris nivea by Jean Louis Marie Poiret in Lamarck's Encyclopédie Méthodique, Botanique in 1804. He based his description on a specimen collected in Peru by Joseph de Jussieu. The specific epithet nivea, meaning "snowy", evidently refers to the "snow-white" color of the farina beneath the leaves. Shortly thereafter, in 1806, Olof Swartz independently described the same species as Acrostichum albidulum, based on South American material from Luis Née. He distinguished Acrostichum by the presence of sporangia widely spread over the back of the leaf, rather than in discrete sori. The epithet albidulum, meaning "somewhat white", presumably also refers to the presence of the white farina, which he described with the same word; he credited the origin of the name to Antonio José Cavanilles, who, however, never published it.

Poiret's rather wide circumscription of Pteris was subsequently narrowed by other botanists, removing cheilanthoids like P. nivea. However, delineating natural genera in the cheilanthoids has proven to be extremely difficult, and many different placements of the species were subsequently put forward. In 1811, Nicaise Auguste Desvaux revived the genus Cincinalis with his own circumscription, distinguishing it by the presence of sporangia spreading more from the margins than in Pteris but not so widely as in Acrostichum. He transferred the species there as C. nivea, and recognized A. albidulum as a synonym. Problems with the application and form of the name Cincinalis led Desvaux to abandon it in 1813 in favor of Notholaena, placing the species there as N. nivea, a name commonly used by other botanists for the species until the late 20th century. However, he reversed course in 1827 and moved it from Notholaena to Acrostichum as A. niveum.

In 1859, Mettenius recognized the genus Gymnogramma for species where sporangia were borne along the nerves and not densely clustered at the end of the nerves. He transferred the species there as G. nivea. Prantl expanded Pellaea to include several genera in which he perceived close affinities, including Gymnogramma. Accordingly, he transferred G. nivea to Pellaea section Cincinalis as P. nivea in 1882. Rodolfo Amando Philippi described material from the Tarapacá Region of Chile as Cincinalis tarapacana in 1891, but George Hieronymus, in 1909, considered it at most a form of P. nivea.

Both Edwin Copeland and Charles Alfred Weatherby suggested in the 1940s that N. nivea and a group of related ferns might represent a genus distinct from Notholaena. Weatherby thought that, until that genus was described, the group might better be placed in Pellaea, rather than in Notholaena, following the example of Prantl, but died in 1949 before he could circumscribe and publish it.

The recognition of the N. nivea group as a genus was finally addressed in 1987 by Michael D. Windham, who was carrying out phylogenetic studies of the cheilanthoids. He elevated Notholaena sect. Argyrochosma to become the genus Argyrochosma, and transferred this species to that genus as A. nivea. In 2018, Maarten J. M. Christenhusz transferred the species to Hemionitis as H. nivea, as part of a program to consolidate the cheilanthoid ferns into that genus. Meanwhile, in a 2017 treatment of Bolivian ferns, Kessler and Smith altered the circumscription of the species to exclude A. nivea var. flava and A. nivea var. tenera, elevating both to species level on the grounds of consistent differences in morphology and range and continued distinctness when growing sympatrically.

Distribution
It is found from Ecuador south to Argentina along the Andes. 

It typically grows in rock crevices or on rocky soil in dry valleys, often in open areas among deciduous forest.

Notes and references

References

Works cited

nivea
Ferns of Chile
Flora of the Andes
Ferns of the Americas
Plants described in 1804